This is a list of video games based on various Hanna-Barbera cartoon series. The list is not complete or exhaustive.

Hanna-Barbera-based video games

Yogi Bear
Yogi's Frustration (1983)
Yogi Bear (1987)
Yogi Bear & Friends in The Greed Monster (1989)
Yogi's Great Escape (1990)
Yogi Bear's Math Adventures (1990)
Yogi's Big Clean Up (1992)
Adventures of Yogi Bear (1994)
Yogi Bear's Gold Rush (1994)
Yogi Bear: Great Balloon Blast (2000)
Yogi Bear: The Video Game (2010)

The Flintstones
Yabba Dabba Doo! (1986)
The Flintstones (1988)
The Flintstones: Dino: Lost in Bedrock (1991)
The Flintstones: The Rescue of Dino & Hoppy (1991)
The Flintstones: King Rock Treasure Island (1993)
The Flintstones (1993)
The Flintstones: Surprise at Dinosaur Peak (1994)
The Flintstones: The Treasure of Sierra Madrock (1994)
Fred Flintstone's Memory Match (1994)
Flintstones/Jetsons Time Warp  (1994)
The Flintstones: The Movie (1994/1995)
The Flintstones (a.k.a. Fred in Magic Wood Land) (1998)
The Flintstones: Bedrock Bowling (2000)
The Flintstones: BurgerTime in Bedrock (2000)
The Flintstones: Big Trouble in Bedrock (2001)
The Flintstones in Viva Rock Vegas (2002)

The Jetsons
The Jetsons' Ways with Words (1984)
The Jetsons: By George, in Trouble Again (1990)
The Jetsons: George Jetson and the Legend of Robotopia (1990)
Jetsons: The Computer Game (1991)
The Jetsons: Cogswell's Caper! (1992)
The Jetsons: Robot Panic (1992)
The Jetsons: Mealtime Malfunction (1993)
The Jetsons: Invasion of the Planet Pirates (1994)
Flintstones/Jetsons Time Warp (1994)

Wacky Races
Wacky Races (1991)
Wacky Races (2000)
Wacky Races: Starring Dastardly and Muttley (2001)
Wacky Races: Mad Motors (2007)
Wacky Races: Crash and Dash (2008)

Scooby-Doo
Scooby-Doo's Maze Chase (1983)
Scooby-Doo (a.k.a. Scooby Doo in the Castle Mystery) (1986)
Scooby-Doo and Scrappy-Doo (1991)
Scooby-Doo Mystery (1995)
Scooby-Doo! Mystery of the Fun Park Phantom (1999)
Scooby-Doo! Mystery Adventures (2000) (series)
Scooby-Doo: Showdown in Ghost Town (2000)
Scooby-Doo: Phantom of the Knight (2000)
Scooby-Doo: Jinx at the Sphinx (2000)
Scooby-Doo! Classic Creep Capers (2000)
Scooby-Doo and the Cyber Chase (2001)
Scooby-Doo (2002)
Scooby-Doo! Night of 100 Frights (2002)
Scooby-Doo Case Files (2003) (series)
Scooby-Doo Case File Number 1: The Glowing Bug Man (2003)
Scooby-Doo Case File Number 2: The Scary Stone Dragon (2003)
Scooby-Doo Case File Number 3: Frights, Camera, Mystery! (2003)
Scooby-Doo! Mystery Mayhem (2003)
Scooby-Doo 2: Monsters Unleashed (2004)
Scooby-Doo! Unmasked (2005)
Scooby-Doo! First Frights (2009)
Scooby-Doo! and the Spooky Swamp (2010)
Scooby Doo! Mystery Cases (2018)

See also
List of Tom and Jerry video games

References

External links

Hanna-Barbera

Hanna-Barbera